The logic of information, or the logical theory of information, considers the information content of logical signs and expressions along the lines initially developed by Charles Sanders Peirce.  In this line of work, the concept of information serves to integrate the aspects of signs and expressions that are separately covered, on the one hand, by the concepts of denotation and extension, and on the other hand, by the concepts of connotation and comprehension.

Peirce began to develop these ideas in his lectures "On the Logic of Science" at Harvard University (1865) and the Lowell Institute (1866).

See also

 Charles Sanders Peirce bibliography
 Information theory
 Inquiry
 Philosophy of information
 Pragmatic maxim
 Pragmatic theory of information
 Pragmatic theory of truth
 Pragmaticism
 Pragmatism
 Scientific method
 Semeiotic
 Semiosis
 Semiotics
 Semiotic information theory
 Sign relation
 Sign relational complex
 Triadic relation

References

 Luciano Floridi, The Logic of Information, presentation, discussion, Télé-université (Université du Québec), 11 May 2005, Montréal, Canada.
 Luciano Floridi, The logic of being informed, Logique et Analyse. 2006, 49.196, 433–460.

External links
 Peirce, C.S. (1867), "Upon Logical Comprehension and Extension", Eprint

Information theory
Semiotics
Logic
Charles Sanders Peirce